Hrithik Shokeen (born 14 August 2000) is an Indian cricketer. In November 2019, he was named in India U23's squad for the 2019 ACC Emerging Teams Asia Cup in Bangladesh. He made his List A debut for India U23, against Nepal, in the Emerging Teams Cup on 14 November 2019. In February 2022, he was bought by the Mumbai Indians in the auction for the 2022 Indian Premier League (IPL) tournament. He made his Twenty20 debut on 21 April 2022, for the Mumbai Indians in the 2022 IPL.

References

External links
 

2000 births
Living people
Indian cricketers
Cricketers from Delhi
Mumbai Indians cricketers